The Yushima Seidō Exposition was held at Taiseiden Hall, previously a Shinto shrine. It opened on 10 March 1872, closed 20 days later and displayed more than 600 items.

Context
The exhibition took place a year before Vienna's world's fair, and was used as an opportunity to collate items for both events.

Contents
There were over 600 exhibits: cultural artefacts and  natural exhibits. One of the sashi from Nagoya Castle was shown, and very popular.

Visitors
The Emperor visited on 13 March and the Empress on 30 March.
192 878 visited in total.

Legacy
After the event much of the collection was opened as a permanent museum, which lead Tokyo National Museum's establishment.

Gallery

References

1872 in Japan
19th century in Tokyo
World's fairs in Tokyo